Dedication is an album by pianist Steve Kuhn which was recorded in 1997 and released on the Reservoir label.

Reception

The AllMusic review by Ken Dryden called it "a multifaceted trio session" which "opens with a pair of enjoyable originals ...  does justice to two compositions by bassist Steve Swallow" and "His fresh, somewhat darker approach to Kenny Dorham's catchy "Blue Bossa" starts subtly but grows in intensity. Nor does the leader ignore standards. His bright, swinging take of "It's You or No One," the lush setting of "For Heaven's Sake," and a loping waltz treatment of "Like Someone in Love " all merit high praise". In JazzTimes, Bret Primack noted "What truly delights on Dedication is Kuhn’s phrasing and elucidation, the ability to make each composition his own. Also notable, the way his sympathetic rhythm section pushes the music and increases the energy level".

Track listing
All compositions by Steve Kuhn except where noted
 "Dedication" – 6:13
 "The Zoo" – 5:50
 "I Waited for You" (Gil Fuller, Dizzy Gillespie) – 5:51
 "Eiderdown" (Steve Swallow) – 5:38
 "Please Let Go" (Swallow) – 7:29
 "It's You or No One" (Jule Styne, Sammy Cahn) – 8:02	
 "For Heaven's Sake" (Sherman Edwards, Donald Meyer, Elise Bretton) – 6:12
 "Like Someone in Love" (Jimmy Van Heusen, Johnny Burke) – 7:18
 "Blue Bossa" (Kenny Dorham) – 5:55

Personnel
Steve Kuhn – piano 
David Finck – bass 
Billy Drummond – drums

References

Steve Kuhn albums
1998 albums
Reservoir Records albums
Albums recorded at Van Gelder Studio